The Geodetic Reference System 1980 (GRS 80) is a geodetic reference system consisting of a global reference ellipsoid and a normal gravity model.

Background
Geodesy is the scientific discipline that deals with the measurement and representation of the earth, its gravitational field and geodynamic phenomena (polar motion, earth tides, and crustal motion) in three-dimensional, time-varying space.

The geoid is essentially the figure of the Earth abstracted from its topographic features. It is an idealized equilibrium surface of sea water, the mean sea level surface in the absence of currents, air pressure variations etc. and continued under the continental masses. The geoid, unlike the ellipsoid, is irregular and too complicated to serve as the computational surface on which to solve geometrical problems like point positioning.

A reference ellipsoid, customarily chosen to be the same size (volume) as the geoid, is described by its semi-major axis (equatorial
radius) a and flattening f. The quantity f = (a−b)/a, where b is the semi-minor axis (polar radius), is a purely geometrical one. The mechanical ellipticity of the earth (dynamical flattening, symbol J2) is determined to high precision by observation of satellite orbit perturbations. Its relationship with the geometric flattening is indirect. The relationship depends on the internal density distribution.

The 1980 Geodetic Reference System (GRS 80) posited a  semi-major axis and a  flattening. This system was adopted at the XVII General Assembly of the International Union of Geodesy and Geophysics (IUGG) in Canberra, Australia, 1979.

The GRS 80 reference system was originally used by the World Geodetic System 1984 (WGS 84). The reference ellipsoid of WGS 84 now differs slightly due to later refinements.

The numerous other systems which have been used by diverse countries for their maps and charts are gradually dropping out of use as more and more countries move to global, geocentric reference systems using the GRS80 reference ellipsoid.

Definition
The reference ellipsoid is usually defined by its semi-major axis (equatorial
radius)  and either its semi-minor axis (polar radius) , aspect ratio  or flattening , but GRS80 is an exception: For a complete definition, four independent constants are required.

 Defining geometrical constants
Semi-major axis = Equatorial Radius = ;

 Defining physical constants
Geocentric gravitational constant determined from the gravitational constant and the earth mass with atmosphere ;
Dynamical form factor ;
Angular velocity of rotation ;

Derived quantities

 Derived geometrical constants (all rounded)
Flattening =  = 0.003 352 810 681 183 637 418;
Reciprocal of flattening =  = 298.257 222 100 882 711 243;
Semi-minor axis = Polar Radius =  = 6 356 752.314 140 347 m;
Aspect ratio =  = 0.996 647 189 318 816 363;
Mean radius as defined by the International Union of Geodesy and Geophysics (IUGG):  = 6 371 008.7714 m;
Authalic mean radius =  = 6 371 007.1809 m;
Radius of a sphere of the same volume =  = 6 371 000.7900 m;
Linear eccentricity =  = 521 854.0097 m;
Eccentricity of elliptical section through poles =  = 0.081 819 191 0428;
Polar radius of curvature =  = 6 399 593.6259 m;
Equatorial radius of curvature for a meridian =  = 6 335 439.3271 m;
Meridian quadrant = 10 001 965.7292 m;

 Derived physical constants (rounded)
Period of rotation (sidereal day) =  = 86 164.100 637 s

The formula giving the eccentricity of the GRS80 spheroid is:

where

The equation is solved iteratively to give

which gives

References

External links
GRS 80 Specification 

Geodesy